Shenzhen Christian Church is a Protestant church located in Meilin Road, Futian District, Shenzhen, Guangdong, China.

History
The introduction of Christianity into the Shenzhen area began in 1846, belonging to the Basel Mission and Rhenish Missionary Society. It had established 27 churches and missionaries, mainly concentrated in Bao'an.

The old church was founded in 1898 in Luohu District by the Rhenish Missionary Society and was rebuilt in 1949.

In 1966, the Cultural Revolution was launched by Mao Zedong, it was taken as the office of local government, and the church staff went to home to do farm work and the church was forced to halt all activities.

The church again opened to worship on May 27, 1984, after Deng Xiaoping returned to politics.

In 1998, the Shenzhen government provided a  land in Meilin Huaguo Hill of Futian District (including green belt) for the new church of construction land. Groundbreaking ceremony was held on July 3, 1999, and was completed in August 2000. The new church was put into use on December 9, 2001. The new church cost 30 million yuan, more than ninety percent of the donations from local believers in Shenzhen.

Parish
The church has three Sunday Services. One is at 9:00 am on Sunday morning, at 12:00 am Sunday noon and 7:30 pm on Sunday afternoon. There are Weekday Meeting at 7:30am from Tuesday to Saturday.

Transportation
 Take subway Line 9 (Meilin Line) to get off at Xiameilin Station, getting out from Exit C and walk to Xiameilin Market Bus Stop to transfer to bus No. 374, 201 or 67 to Meilin Second Village Bus Stop.
Take bus No. 30, 35, 44, 45, 60, 67, 201, 207, 240, 242, 324 or 361 to Meilin Second Village Bus Stop.

Gallery

References

Further reading

   
 

Churches in Shenzhen
Tourist attractions in Shenzhen
2000 establishments in China
Protestant churches in China
Churches completed in 2000
Futian District